Orphaned Deejay Selek 2006–08 is the twenty-second EP by Richard D. James, released under his AFX moniker, the first EP under that alias since 2005's Analord. It was announced by Warp Records on 2 July 2015, with a listing appearing on Bleep.com on the same day. An announcement for the EP also appeared on the Aphex Twin Twitter account on that date. Along with Warp Records' announcement, "serge fenix Rendered 2", the first track on the EP, was made available for streaming on SoundCloud. The EP was re-released with extra tracks on James' Bleep Store on 20 July 2017. The cover is by The Designers Republic.

Track listing
Original release

2017 re-release

Charts

References

External links
 
http://warp.net/news/orphaned-deejay-selek-2006-2008/
https://bleep.com/release/61781-afx-orphaned-deejay-selek-2006-2008
https://soundcloud.com/richarddjames/serge-fenix-rendered-2

Aphex Twin EPs
2015 EPs
Warp (record label) EPs
Albums with cover art by The Designers Republic